Zarqa Suharwardy Taimur is a Pakistani politician who has been a Member of the Senate of Pakistan, since March 2021.

She is a consultant aesthetic cosmetologist by profession.
She joined PTI in 2010. She won a gold medal during her studies in Punjab University in 1989.

References

21st-century Pakistani women politicians
Members of the Senate of Pakistan
Pakistan Tehreek-e-Insaf politicians
Year of birth missing (living people)
Living people